Juvitu Correia da Silva or Juvitu (born January 27, 1987) is an East Timorese footballer who currently play for Carsae FC on the Liga Futebol Amadora as defender. He also play for Timor-Leste national football team.

References

1987 births
Living people
East Timorese footballers
East Timorese men's futsal players
Association football defenders
Timor-Leste international footballers
People from Dili